Xabier Etxeita Gorritxategi (born 31 October 1987) is a Spanish professional footballer who plays for SD Amorebieta mainly as a centre-back.

Club career
Born in Amorebieta-Etxano, Biscay, Etxeita finished his development within Athletic Bilbao's prolific youth academy at Lezama, after playing with hometown club SD Amorebieta. His first three games with the first team of the former, all in 2008–09's La Liga, were not without incidents: in his first, a 2–0 home win against neighbours CA Osasuna on 16 November 2008, he subbed in for injured Ustaritz, being sent off in the following against CD Numancia (same venue and result). On 21 December, he replaced Ander Murillo who also retired before half-time due to injury, in a 1–0 away victory over Real Betis. During the season, however, he was mainly registered with the B side.

In the last days of the 2010 January transfer window, Etxeita moved on a five-month loan to FC Cartagena of the second division. On 16 July 2010 he left Athletic and signed with another club at that level, Elche CF, quickly going on to establish himself in the starting XI.

On 4 June 2013, after contributing 40 games and four goals as the Valencian Community team returned to the top flight after more than 20 years, Etxeita returned to Athletic Bilbao on a free transfer. He only made his official debut on 7 April of the following year, featuring the full 90 minutes in a 2–1 away win over Levante UD.

Etxeita scored his first competitive goal for Athletic on 25 October 2014, the only in a league fixture at UD Almería. His second came on 4 March of the following year, as he helped to a 2–0 defeat of RCD Espanyol in Barcelona to make his team reach the final of the Copa del Rey for the first time in three years; he played the entire decisive match, a 3–1 loss to FC Barcelona, and also started both legs of the subsequent edition of the Supercopa de España against the same opponent, which was won 5–1 on aggregate and brought a first trophy for the player.

On 24 July 2018, Exteita was loaned to fellow top-division side SD Huesca for one year. In August 2019, the free agent left the San Mamés Stadium and joined Getafe CF of the same tier on a two-year contract.

On 15 July 2021, Exteita signed a one-year deal with SD Eibar, recently relegated to the second division. Having been released at the end of the season, he returned to his first club Amorebieta in September 2022.

International career
Etxeita received his first call up to the senior Spain national team in October 2015. He earned his first cap on the 12th, featuring the full 90 minutes in a 1–0 win in Ukraine – the last round, the nation had already secured the first position in its group – for the UEFA Euro 2016 qualifiers.

He also featured for the unofficial Basque Country regional side.

Career statistics

Club

Honours
Athletic Bilbao
Supercopa de España: 2015

References

External links

 

1987 births
Living people
People from Amorebieta-Etxano
Sportspeople from Biscay
Spanish footballers
Footballers from the Basque Country (autonomous community)
Association football defenders
La Liga players
Segunda División players
Segunda División B players
Tercera División players
Primera Federación players
SD Amorebieta footballers
Bilbao Athletic footballers
Athletic Bilbao footballers
FC Cartagena footballers
Elche CF players
SD Huesca footballers
Getafe CF footballers
SD Eibar footballers
Spain international footballers
Basque Country international footballers